Tõnu Laigu (born 14 February 1956, in Tallinn) is an Estonian architect.

From 1963 to 1974 Tõnu Laigu studied in the 46th Secondary School of Tallinn (today's Pelgulinna Gymnasium of Tallinn). From 1975 Tõnu Laigu studied in the State Art Institute of the Estonian SSR (today's Estonian Academy of Arts) in the department of architecture. He graduated from the institute in 1979.

From 1979 to 1989 Tõnu Laigu worked in the state design bureau Eesti Kommunaalprojekt (Estonian Communal Design). From 1989 to 1990 he worked in the architectural bureau E-Stuudio OÜ and from 1990 to 2001 in the architectural bureau Kuup OÜ. From 2001 Tõnu Laigu works in the architectural bureau QP Arhitektid OÜ.

Most notable works by Tõnu Laigu are the apartment building on the Sõpruse road, the logistics center of the COAL company and the new apartment building on the Mäepealse street. Tõnu Laigu is a member of the Union of Estonian Architects and belongs to the board of the union.

Works
Single-family home in Tallinn, 1989
Apartment building in Narva, 1989
Kose Secondary School, 1990
Apartment building in Tallinn, 2000
Single-family home Nõmme, 2002
Apartment building on Sõpruse road, 2003
Duplex in Nõmme, 2004
AS COAL logistics center, 2005
Single-family home Nõmme, 2005
Athletics hall of Pärnu, 2006
Apartment buildings on Mäepealse Street, 2008

Competitions
Modern Art Museum of Helsinki, 1993
Western Entrance of the Tallinn Zoo, 2005; II Prize
Kihnu Harbour, 2005; II prize
Tabasalu center, 2007; I prize
Sports hall of the Lyceé Francais in Tallinn, 2007; I prize

References

Union of Estonian Architects, members
Architectural bureau QP Arhitektid OÜ, works

1956 births
Living people
Architects from Tallinn
Estonian Academy of Arts alumni